St. Mary Parish is a Roman Catholic parish in New Haven, Connecticut, part of the  Archdiocese of Hartford. The Parish of St. Mary consists of two churches: St. Mary's Church on Hillhouse Avenue, and St. Joseph's Church in the East Rock section of New Haven.

The parish now known as St. Mary's was the first Catholic church in New Haven, and is the second oldest Roman Catholic parish in Connecticut. The parish was originally established in 1832 and the present St. Mary church building is located near Yale University. It is part of the Roman Catholic Archdiocese of Hartford. In 1882, Michael J. McGivney,  the church's assistant pastor, founded the Knights of Columbus at the parish.  McGivney, whose remains are interred within the church, was beatified by Pope Francis in 2020.

For 135 years, from 1886 until their departure in December 2021, St. Mary's parish had been run by friars of the Dominican Order. In 2021, priests from the archdiocese were assigned as part of major restructuring of parishes in New Haven. In 2018, the parish of St. Mary had previously merged with the nearby parish of St. Joseph as part of an earlier restructuring; both church buildings remain open for regularly schedule worship as part of the consolidated Saint Mary Parish.

St. Mary's
In the summer of 1827, Irish immigrants working the Enfield Falls Canal at Windsor Locks sent to New York for a priest to tend to one of their number who had fallen grievously ill. Vicar general John Power responded. Learning of the large number of Catholics in the area, he returned again in October. From there he went to New Haven, and having missed the boat for New York, stayed over. It being Sunday, a group of Catholics requested use of a small chapel on the Long Wharf, and being refused next resorted to a barroom. Benches were brought in and blankets hung to obscure the view while Mass was said.

On July 14, 1829, R.D. Woodley of Providence arrived from Hartford and said Mass and administered the sacraments in a barn at the corner of Chapel and Chestnut Streets, called at the time "Sliny's Corner". In August of that year, Bernard O'Cavanaugh arrived in Hartford as the first resident priest in Connecticut. He made periodic visits to New Haven, where he celebrated Mass in the house of a Mr. Newman. James Fitton from Hartford was delayed saying midnight Mass in 1831 when his horse gave out four miles from town and he had to walk the rest of the way.

In September 1832 James McDermot was assigned as assistant to Fitton at Hartford, but not long after was appointed to New Haven. This also entailed mission stations at Bridgeport, Waterbury, Derby, Norwalk, Danbury, Meriden, Middletown, Goshen, Tariffville, and other places. The congregation at New Haven numbered about 200.

Christ Church
Their Protestant neighbors were averse to doing anything to encourage "popery" and refused to allow the use of or rent and space that might be used as a gathering place. Nonetheless, a lot was secured through Jannett Driscoll, a Protestant who had married a Catholic. The small frame church was scheduled to be dedicated on the Feast of the Ascension, May 8, 1834, but just prior to the ceremony, the gallery gave way and two people were killed in the collapse. The carpenter had decided that trusses would provide sufficient support rather than the planned columns. Some days later, Benedict Fenwick of Boston blessed the building, naming it "Christ Church". In October of that year, the church was broken into and a crucifix and silver chalice stolen. Protestant members of the community presented the church with a fine silver chalice to replace the one taken.

James Smyth became pastor in 1837, and enlarged the church. It burned down on the night of June 11, 1848 and was thought to be arson. The following month Smyth was transferred to Windsor Locks, and succeeded as pastor by Philip O'Reilly. Services were held in a tent for some months, until O'Reilly purchased the Congregationalist building on church Street. The church was dedicated under the name of St. Mary, by William Tyler of Hartford on December 18, 1848.

Present church
Property on Hillhouse Avenue was secured in July 1868. Architect James Murphy of Providence, Rhode Island was commissioned to draft the plans. The construction of a Catholic church on Hillhouse Avenue was strongly opposed by the Protestant elite who lived in the area. The church was dedicated in 1874.

Since 1886, St. Mary's Church has been under the care of the Dominican friars of the Province of St. Joseph, based in New York City. The present priory building next door to the church was erected in 1907.

In 1982, in recognition of the 100th Anniversary of the Knights of Columbus, the church went through a complete renovation. Although included in Murphy's original plans, the spire was never completed. The installation of the spire was part of the renovations, courtesy of the Knights of Columbus.

From February 2019 to October 2020, the St. Mary church building was temporarily closed for emergency repairs; century-old plaster had come loose and fallen from the ceiling. In addition to the plaster repairs, the John Canning Company performed extensive research into the historic decorative schemes of the church, to inform its new repainting and decoration of the interior. Their efforts included forensic removal of the outer layers of interior paint to uncover original 1800s and early 1900s stenciling details and paint colors. According to the National Catholic Register, "St. Mary's early decorations inspired all the stencil patterns for the arches, aisle walls and wainscot since the Canning crew was able to find and use those patterns exactly or modify them to work with the overall idea". Further review of archival photographs and newspaper accounts revealed circular tondo portraits of saints in each arched bay along the naive, as well as portraits of three angels above the main altar; the Canning Company recreated these tondos, working with the parish to choose a new series of modern and historic saints to be depicted. The three archangels were also depicted above the altar, reflective of increased devotion to Saint Michael according to pastor.

The church reopened in October 2020, in time for the October 31st beatification mass of Michael J. McGivney, who founded the Knights of Columbus at St. Mary's in 1882. While the beatification mass itself was celebrated at the Cathedral of Saint Joseph in Hartford, a concurrent ceremony including a live broadcast of the mass and veneration of a relic of McGivney was held at St. Mary's.

St. Joseph's

St. Joseph Parish  started as a mission of St. Mary's in 1894, meeting in a chapel of convenience on Lawrence Street. St. Joseph's was established as an independent parish in 1900, from territory taken in part from St. Mary's and also the parishes of St. Patrick and St. Francis, both in New Haven. The present St. Joseph church building was constructed between 1904 and 1905, and was dedicated on October 22, 1905.

Between 2010 and 2015, the number of families registered at each parish reduced significantly. After briefly sharing a pastor with St. Mary's after 2015, the two parishes were merged by decree of Archbishop Leonard Paul Blair, effective June 29, 2017, with a goal of increasing the combined parish's spiritual and financial health.

The 1904 colonial revival-style St. Joseph church building and neighboring 1885 Queen Anne-style rectory building are listed as contributing structures within the Whitney Avenue Historic District.

Restructuring of New Haven Parishes

In October 2021, Archbishop Leonard Paul Blair announced a major restructuring of parishes in New Haven into a municipal model parish, whereby all 10 churches in the city would be consolidated into single parish corporation administered on the premises of St. Mary Church. As part of the reorganization, the Dominican Order left St. Mary's on December 1, 2021, and two diocesan priests were assigned to take over as pastor and parochial vicar. The newly appointed pastor of St. Mary Parish would guide the transition process and eventually become pastor of the consolidated city-wide parish. The St. Mary Priory building would house the pastor and associate priests appointed to serve the churches in New Haven. The formal consolidation is tentatively planned to occur in 2022 or 2023; all 10 church buildings in the city would remain open for Sunday mass in the initial phase of the consolidation. In 2018, the parish of St. Mary had previously consolidated with the nearby parish of St. Joseph; both church buildings remain open for regularly schedule worship as part of the consolidated Saint Mary Parish.

See also
 Michael J. McGivney
 Knights of Columbus Building (New Haven, Connecticut)

References

External links 

 Official site
 Archdiocese of Hartford

Roman Catholic churches in Connecticut
Churches in New Haven, Connecticut
Gothic Revival church buildings in Connecticut
James Murphy (architect) buildings
Knights of Columbus buildings in the United States
Roman Catholic churches completed in 1874
Roman Catholic parishes of Archdiocese of Hartford
19th-century Roman Catholic church buildings in the United States